The Lebanon women's national football team is the representative women's association football team of Lebanon. Its governing body is the Lebanese Football Association (LFA) and it competes as a member of the Asian Football Confederation (AFC). The national team's first activity was in 2006, when they played in the Arab Women's Championship.

Lebanon's first qualification tournament was the 2014 AFC Women's Asian Cup qualification. The team finished runners-up in the 2022 edition of the WAFF Women's Championship, and in third place at the 2007 and 2019 editions.

Record per opponent

Key

The following table shows Lebanon's all-time official international record per opponent:

Last updated: Lebanon vs Syria, 4 September 2022.

Results

2006

2007

2010

2011

2013

2015

2017

2018

2019

2021

2022

See also
 Lebanon national football team results
 List of Lebanon women's international footballers

References

External links
 Lebanon results and fixtures on FA Lebanon
 Lebanon results on The Roon Ba

Results
2000s in Lebanon
2010s in Lebanon
2020s in Lebanon
Women's national association football team results
Women's